17 January — At least 7 people killed when a bomb exploded in Karachi.
5 February — At least 5 people killed in a bomb attack in a train in Hyderabad.

References

 
2000 in Pakistan
2000
January 2000 events in Pakistan
February 2000 events in Pakistan
2000 murders in Pakistan